The Finnish Navy Band (Finnish: Laivaston soittokunta, LAIVSK) is the official representative band of the Finnish Navy serving from its headquarters in the southwestern coastal city of Turku. The band’s area of responsibility includes Turku and western Finland. The 32-member military band is currently led by two conductors, Lieutenant Commander Petri Junna, and Captain Lieutenant Tero Haikala. Musicians work as part of the Navy Command Finland in the same city they are based in.

History and present events
It was established in 1919, two years after Finland gained its independence from the Russian Empire. Increased cooperation with the school of music has taken the form of soloist concerts and traineeships for students. Like all Finnish Defence Force bands, it provides musical accompaniment for ceremonial events in relation to the country, and in the band's case, events connected to the Finnish Navy. The band's repertoire includes all types of music – from ceremonial pieces to classical and jazz songs. It is usually active on naval ships, naval bases, and military installations, performing for the sailors and officers who are located at these locations during these visits. Every summer, the band performs at the Finnish President’s summer home of Kultaranta in Naantali.

Ensembles
The following five units are ensembles of the navy band:
 Ceremonial Band - It is used during events that require marching and/or events of state importance.
 Concert Band - It is used during mostly during indoor events and, like its name implies, concerts and events of that nature.
 Brass Septet - Established in 2013 due to the reform of military bands which took place that same year. 
 Brass Quintet
 Wind Quintet

Instrumentation

 1 flute
 1 piccolo 
 1 oboe
 6 clarinets
 1 bassoon 
 3 saxophones
 4 french horns
 5 trumpets
 3 trombones
 2 baritone horns
 2 tubas
 3 percussion

References

1919 establishments in Finland
Finnish Navy
Finnish military bands
Musical groups established in 1919